The BBC Board is the governing board of the British Broadcasting Corporation. The Board replaced the BBC Trust in April 2017. The chairman is Richard Sharp.

The chair and four non-executive members representing the four nations are appointed by the  King-in-Council, on the advice of the UK Secretary of State. Five other non-executive members are appointed by the board and the four executive members are chosen by the board.

Executive committee
The executive committee is responsible for the day-to-day operations of the broadcaster.

References

External links
BBC Board